Whalebones Park is a 14-acre area of fields and woods in Chipping Barnet, London Borough of Barnet, England, between Barnet Hospital and Wood Street.

It is home to the grade II listed house known as The Whalebones, which was built in the early 19th century, and a whale bone arch.

In 2018 it was reported that the area was being considered for development, leading to a campaign to save it as a public park. The planning proposal by Hill Residential to build 152 homes on the park was rejected in 2020.

References

Urban public parks
Chipping Barnet